Derek or Derrick Green may refer to:

Politics and law
Derek Green (judge), Canadian judge
Derek S. Green, Philadelphia city councilmember

Musicians
Derrick Green, American musician
Derek Green (music), music executive and founder of China Records

Sportsmen
Derek Green (cyclist), British cyclist
Derrick Green (American football)
Derek Green (figure skating), figure skater who competed in the 2008 Canadian Figure Skating Championships
Derek Green (speedway rider), speedway rider who competed in the 1989 British Speedway League